This is a list of members of the Australian House of Representatives from 1961 to 1963, as elected at the 1961 federal election.

 At this time, the members for the Northern Territory and Australian Capital Territory could only vote on matters relating to their respective territories.
 The Labor member for Batman, Alan Bird, died on 21 July 1962; Labor candidate Sam Benson won the resulting by-election on 1 September.
 The Labor member for Grey, Edgar Russell, died on 31 March 1963; Labor candidate Jack Mortimer won the resulting by-election on 1 June.
 The Labor member for East Sydney, Eddie Ward, died on 31 July 1963; Labor candidate Len Devine won the resulting by-election on 28 September.

References

Members of Australian parliaments by term
20th-century Australian politicians